is the eighth CD single containing 4 versions of the titular song by Minori Chihara. The single was used as the ending theme to The Disappearance of Haruhi Suzumiya, in which Chihara again reprises her role as Yuki Nagato. It won the Best Singing Award at the fifth annual Seiyu Awards held in 2011 in Tokyo for Chihara's performance. A promotional video for the song, filmed in the Haruhi Suzumiya franchise's real-world parallel setting of Nishinomiya-Kita Prefectural High School, was released January 27, 2010 on Lantis' official YouTube channel.

Track listing
 - 5:39
 - 4:33
 - 5:11
 - 3:13

Personnel
Vocals: Minori Chihara
Lyrics: Aki Hata
Composition: Masumi Ito
Arrangement: Nijine
Original Lyrics: Nagaru Tanigawa

Oricon chart positions

See also
2010 in Japanese music

References

External links
 "Yasashii Bōkyaku" Facebook
 "Yasashii Bōkyaku" CDJapan
 "Yasashii Bōkyaku" Last.fm
 "Yasashii Bōkyaku" Rate Your Music
 "Yasashii Bōkyaku" Oricon Profile
 

Minori Chihara songs
Lantis (company) singles
2010 singles
J-pop songs
Japanese songs
Japanese-language songs
2010 songs
Seiyu Award winners
Japanese film songs
Songs written for animated films